Valentin Ivanovich Morkovkin (20 September 1933 – 1999) was a Russian rower who competed for the Soviet Union in the 1960 Summer Olympics.

He was born in Nizhny Novgorod.

In 1960 he was a crew member of the Soviet boat which won the bronze medal in the coxless fours event.

References 
 

1933 births
1999 deaths
Russian male rowers
Soviet male rowers
Olympic rowers of the Soviet Union
Rowers at the 1960 Summer Olympics
Olympic bronze medalists for the Soviet Union
Olympic medalists in rowing
Medalists at the 1960 Summer Olympics
Sportspeople from Nizhny Novgorod